"I'll Award You with My Body" is a song by American singer, dancer, DJ and rapper Redfoo, formerly known as half of LMFAO. The song, written and produced by Redfoo, was released on 6 June 2013. It was not promoted and was not a success on the charts, only charting in Australia at number 58. The song charted primarily due to the buzz surrounding Redfoo joining the Australian version of The X Factor in mid-2013. His subsequent single would top the chart and be certified 4× Platinum.

Charts

Release history

References

External links
 

2013 singles
2013 songs
Interscope Records singles
Songs written by Redfoo